Basil Glass (21 April 1926 – 30 September 2005) was a politician in Northern Ireland.

Born in County Leitrim, Glass studied at Queen's University Belfast; he qualified as a solicitor in 1950 and became a prominent lawyer. He was elected joint treasurer of the New Ulster Movement, with fellow solicitor Oliver Napier, in 1969. The following year, he became the first Chairman of the Alliance Party of Northern Ireland.

In 1973, Glass became the President of the Alliance Party, and he was elected to the Northern Ireland Assembly for South Belfast, acting as the party's chief whip in the Assembly. At the October 1974 general election he stood for the Westminster seat of South Belfast, taking second position and almost one quarter of the vote.

Glass was again elected to represent South Belfast on the Northern Ireland Constitutional Convention in 1975. In 1976, he became the Alliance Party's deputy leader. In 1977 he was elected to Belfast City Council, a post he held for four years. At the 1979 general election, he slightly improved his performance for the Westminster seat.

Glass narrowly failed to be elected to the Northern Ireland Assembly, 1982, and thereafter scaled back his political activities. In 1987, he was appointed to the post of High Court Bankruptcy Master in Northern Ireland.

He was described by John Wilson QC, Clerk of the Crown for Northern Ireland, as "a gentleman and a scholar."

References

Bibliography
Queens University Belfast: Obituaries
South Belfast 1973–1984
"Alliance Founder Basil Glass Dies", Belfast Telegraph

1926 births
2005 deaths
Alliance Party of Northern Ireland politicians
Members of Belfast City Council
Members of the Northern Ireland Assembly 1973–1974
Members of the Northern Ireland Constitutional Convention
Alumni of Queen's University Belfast
Politicians from County Leitrim
Alliance Party of Northern Ireland councillors
Alliance Party parliamentary candidates